Wee Town is an unincorporated community in Pierce County, Nebraska, United States. From the 1940s-1970s, Wee Town was a stopping point along Route 81, but the population never exceeded 50 individuals. A service station, a tavern, and a cafe were the most important employers. Wee Town lost its main source of income after new interstates were built in the late 1970s, which displaced Route 81 as the main throughways in the region.

References

Unincorporated communities in Pierce County, Nebraska
Unincorporated communities in Nebraska